Smoke Rise is a census-designated place (CDP) in Blount County, Alabama, United States. At the 2020 census, the population was 1,661.

History
Smoke Rise lies east of Interstate 65 in western Blount County, with most homes sitting atop Bryant Mountain or in the valley below. The community began in the late 1960s as a large planned residential subdivision. Smoke Rise originally was slated to include its own community school, but those plans never came to fruition; today, children there attend public schools in nearby Hayden.

Residents founded the Smoke Rise Homeowners Association in the mid-1990s, but the community remains unincorporated despite occasional discussion of an incorporation vote. Few businesses are in Smoke Rise's immediate vicinity, but many observers expect the impending construction of a new sewer system in western Blount County to fuel commercial growth.

Geography
Smoke Rise is located at 33°52'26.666" North, 86°49'33.643" West (33.874074, -86.826012).

Demographics

2020 census

As of the 2020 United States census, there were 1,661 people, 662 households, and 575 families residing in the CDP.

2010 census
As of the census of 2010, there were 1,825 people, 692 households, and 566 families residing in the CDP. The racial makeup of the CDP was 98.0% White, 0.5% Native American, 0.1% Asian, and 0.8% from two or more races. 0.7% of the population were Hispanic or Latino of any race.

There were 692 households, out of which 27.7% had children under the age of 18 living with them, 69.8% were married couples living together, 9.0% had a female householder with no husband present, and 18.2% were non-families. 15.3% of all households were made up of individuals, and 6.1% had someone living alone who was 65 years of age or older. The average household size was 2.64 and the average family size was 2.91.

In the CDP, the age distribution of the population shows 21.1% under the age of 18, 6.8% from 18 to 24, 23.0% from 25 to 44, 32.6% from 45 to 64, and 16.5% who were 65 years of age or older. The median age was 44.4 years. For every 100 females, there were 94.4 males. For every 100 females age 18 and over, there were 90.0 males.

The median income for a household in the CDP was $71,446, and the median income for a family was $80,333. Males had a median income of $42,969 versus $41,818 for females. The per capita income for the CDP was $27,909. About 0% of families and 0% of the population were below the poverty line, including none of those under age 18 and 0% of those age 65 or over.

References 

Census-designated places in Blount County, Alabama
Census-designated places in Alabama
Birmingham metropolitan area, Alabama
Populated places established in the 1960s